Tekellatus is a monotypic genus of Australian araneomorph spiders in the family Cyatholipidae containing the single species, Tekellatus lamingtoniensis. It was first described by J. Wunderlich in 1978, and has only been found in Australia.

References

Cyatholipidae
Monotypic Araneomorphae genera
Spiders of Australia